Headin' Home is an album by trumpeter Jimmy Owens recorded and released by the A&M/Horizon label in 1978.

Reception 

In his review on Allmusic, Richard S. Ginell notes "Headin' Home goes even further down the road of commercial viability than its predecessor on Horizon, as Owens tries once again to sell some records. Most of the tracks are up-tempo workouts unapologetically aimed for the dancefloor, with rather mellifluous trumpet or flügelhorn lines cresting the waves of wah-wah guitars and semi-funky drumming. Which is not a bad thing in itself, given decent, memorable material -- which this LP mostly lacks".

Track listing 
All compositions by Coleridge-Taylor Perkinson except where noted
 "Home" (Charlie Smalls) − 5:53
 "New Tune" − 5:47
 "Dreaming My Life Away" (Jimmy Owens, Norma Jordan) − 5:45
 "Never Subject to Change" (Owens) − 5:34
 "B. S." − 6:51
 "Sweet Love" (Kenny Barron, Chris White) − 9:42
 "Exercise (Dis'go, Dis'way)" − 6:21

Personnel 
Jimmy Owens – trumpet, flugelhorn
Carlos Alomar (tracks 1-4 & 6), George Davis, Mantwila Nyomo (track 5) − guitar
Kenny Barron (tracks 1-6), Stanley Cowell (track 7) − keyboards
Chris White − bass (tracks 5 & 6)
Gary King − electric bass (tracks 1-4 & 7)
Brian Brake (tracks 1-6), Billy Cobham (track 7) – drums
Erroll 'Crusher' Bennett − percussion (tracks 4-7)
Cecil Bridgewater, Jon Faddis, Virgil Jones, Victor Paz, Charles Sullivan − trumpet (track 7)
Wayne Andre, Earl McIntyre, Alfred Patterson, Janice Robinson − trombone (track 7)
Jerry Dodgion, Alex Foster − alto saxophone, flute (track 7)
Seldon Powell, Harold Vick − tenor saxophone, flute (track 7)
George Barrow − baritone saxophone, flute (track 7)
Coleridge-Taylor Perkinson − arranger (tracks 1, 2, 5 & 7)

References 

Jimmy Owens (musician) albums
1978 albums
Horizon Records albums
A&M Records albums